The National Gallery and Tate Gallery Act 1954 is an Act of the Parliament of the United Kingdom (2 & 3 Eliz II c. 65). The Act came into force in 1955. It created a legal separation between the National Gallery and the Tate Gallery and established the Tate as an independent institution. 

The Act was repealed on 1 September 1992 by the Museums and Galleries Act 1992, which created a board of trustees to operate the Tate.

References

About | Tate
 from legislation.gov.uk 

1954 in London
United Kingdom Acts of Parliament 1954
1992 in British law
Repealed United Kingdom Acts of Parliament
National Gallery, London
Tate galleries
Acts of the Parliament of the United Kingdom concerning museums